The Pacific Trade and Development Conference (PAFTAD) is an informal private academic conference series that, since its origins in 1968, has developed into a driving force behind the development of thought on Pacific trade and development issues and important economic policy questions facing the region.

The ideas and discussions generated by PAFTAD have helped drive and shape other Pacific economic cooperation organisations, including Asia Pacific Economic Cooperation (APEC) and the Pacific Economic Cooperation Council (PECC).

Each PAFTAD conference is organised around a particular theme, and research papers addressing the topic are presented and discussed. The results are published in the PAFTAD volume series.

History

Since its inception in 1968 the PAFTAD conference series has established itself as one of the leading sources of ideas and discussion on issues affecting economic development in the Asia Pacific. A private organisation with no formal government ties, PAFTAD has been, and continues to be a driving force for ideas about policy innovation and development at both the national and regional levels.

The essence of PAFTAD’s contribution is both intellectual and practical: it generates ideas about regional economic exchange and integration, provides empirical evidence to support or reject policy proposals and facilitates ongoing debate among policy influential experts. The ideas and evidence generated by PAFTAD have entered the public policy dialogue of most Asia Pacific economies, due in no small part to the intellectual and policy leadership shown by PAFTAD participants at both a national and regional level.

34th PAFTAD Conference - Beijing 2009

Theme:  “China’s Role in the World Economy”

Host: China Centre for Economic Research (CCER), Peking University

Fellowship for Young Scholars

The PAFTAD Fellowship for Young Scholars is available to graduate students and faculty members aged 35 years and below, and is considered one of the most distinguished fellowships available to young scholars in the region.  The PAFTAD International Steering Committee selects 8 aspiring researchers as PAFTAD Fellows to present papers on themes related to Asia Pacific trade and economic development for each conference.  Selection is based on the quality of a written submission as judged by the Selection Panel from PAFTAD’s distinguished International Steering Committee.

This year the Fellowships will take young scholars to Beijing where they will present their papers the day prior to PAFTAD's 34th Conference on December 6 and participate in the PAFTAD Conference itself on 7–9 December.

International Steering Committee Members

Wendy Dobson (University of Toronto), Chair 
Narongchai Akrasanee (Saranee Holdings), Member 
Wook Chae (KIEP), Member 
Edward Chen (University of Hong Kong), Member 
Pang Eng Fong (Singapore Management University), Member 
Ross Garnaut (The Australian National University), Member 
David Hong (TIER), Member 
Akira Kohsaka (Osaka University), Member 
Justin Lin (World Bank), Member 
Mahani Zainal Abidin (ISIS), Member 
Juan J. Palacios (University of Guadalajara), Member 
Peter Petri (Brandeis International Business School), Member 
Robert Scollay (University of Auckland), Member 
Vo Tri Thanh (CIEM), Member 
Shukiro Urata (Waseda University), Member 
Josef Yap (PID), Member 
Sir Frank Holmes (Victoria University of Wellington), Honorary Member 
Kiyoshi Kojima (Hitotsubashi University), Honorary Member 
Hugh Patrick (Columbia University), Honorary Member 
Ippei Yamazawa (Hitotsubaski University), Honorary Member 
Chia Siow Yue (SIIA), Honorary Member 
Peter Drysdale (The Australian National University), Secretariat

PAFTAD Endowment

The PAFTAD endowment was established in 1999 to support the activities of the PAFTAD.

Previous Conference Themes

• Asia Pacific Trade and Development

• Direct Foreign Investment in Asia and the Pacific

• Obstacles to Trade in the Pacific Area

• Structural Adjustments in Asian-Pacific Trade

• Technology Transfer in Pacific Economic Development

• Cooperation and Development in the Asia Pacific Region: Relations between Large and Small Countries

• Trade and Employment in Asia and the Pacific

• Mineral and Energy Resources in the Pacific Area

• Regional energy security

• ASEAN in a Changing Pacific and World Economy

• Trade and Growth of the Advanced Developing Countries in the Pacific Basin

• Renewable Resources in the Pacific

• Energy and Structural Change in the Asia Pacific Region

• Pacific Growth and Financial Interdependence

• Industrial Policies for Pacific Economic Growth

• Pacific Trade in Services

• Technological Challenge in the Asia-Pacific Economy

• The Pacific Economy: Growth and External Stability

• Economic Reform and Internationalization: China and the Pacific Region

• Pacific Dynamism and the International Economic System Corporate Links and Foreign Direct Investment in Asia and the Pacific

• Environment and Development in the Pacific: Problems and Policy Options

• Business, Markets and Government in the Asia Pacific: Competition Policy, Convergence and Pluralism

• Asia Pacific Financial Deregulation

• APEC: Challenges and Tasks for the 21st Century

• Globalization and the Asia Pacific Economy

• The New Economy in East Asia and the Pacific

• Competition Policy in the New Millennium

• Reshaping the Asia Pacific Economic Order

• Does Trade Deliver what it Promises?

• Multinational Corporations and the Rise of a Network Economy in the Pacific Rim

• International and Regional Institutions and Asia Pacific Development

• The Politics and the Economics of Integration in Asia and the Pacific

Notable alumni

Numerous PAFTAD alumni have occupied senior political and policy positions in regional governments and organisations, with Indonesian Minister of Trade Mari Pangestu, a long-time PAFTAD participant, being a recent example. The extent of PAFTAD’s contribution to regional development was apparent in the formation of APEC.

Two of PAFTAD’s earliest leaders, Professor Sir John Crawford and Dr Saburo Okita, were instrumental in leading their countries to establish the tripartite Pacific Economic Cooperation Committee (PECC). In turn PECC, which shares many
members in common with PAFTAD, developed recognition among nations of the region of the need for a framework to support and enhance the rapid growth in regional trade, investment and technology transfer: APEC.

Academic conferences